Melanella convexa is a species of sea snail, a marine gastropod mollusk in the family Eulimidae. The species is one of many species known to exist within the genus, Melanella. This species is mainly distributed throughout the seas and oceans south of the Antarctic Circle.

Description 
The maximum recorded shell length is 5.75 mm.

Habitat 
Minimum recorded depth is 250 m. Maximum recorded depth is 765 m.

References

External links

convexa
Gastropods described in 1907